Charles "Charlie" Ayres is a managing partner, Chairman of the Board and Chairman of the Executive Committee of Trilantic Capital Partners, formerly known as Lehman Brothers Merchant Banking.

Early life and career
Ayres obtained a B.A. in economics, magna cum laude, from Duke University and an M.B.A. from the Tuck School of Business.

Ayres joined Lehman Brothers Merchant Banking in 2003.  He also sits on the board of Celerity Group Inc.

Charlie was a founding partner of the private equity investment company MidOcean Partners, founded in February 2003.

References

Year of birth missing (living people)
Living people
American businesspeople
Duke University Trinity College of Arts and Sciences alumni
Lehman Brothers people
Tuck School of Business alumni